Norman Guy Von Nida  (14 February 1914 – 20 May 2007) was an Australian professional golfer.

Von Nida was born in Strathfield and grew up in Brisbane. He turned professional in 1933, after attracting attention by winning the 1932 Queensland Amateur aged just 18. He became one of Australia's finest professional golfers, and the first Australian to win regularly on the British tour, although World War II certainly deprived him of competition during what might have been his peak years. In 1946 he travelled to Britain for the first time and finished second on the Order of Merit; in 1947, he returned and won seven tournaments and topped the Order of Merit. He was renowned for his short temper – at a tournament in 1948 he became involved in an argument with future U.S. Ryder Cup player Henry Ransom that resulted in the local sheriff having to pull them apart, and he was also known to hurl his putter into the undergrowth after missing putts, on occasions breaking or even losing them mid-round.

Von Nida was awarded the Medal of the Order of Australia in the 1985 Australia Day Honours for "service to the sport of golf".

The PGA Tour of Australasia's developmental tour is named the Von Nida Tour after him.

Von Nida died in a Gold Coast, Queensland nursing home, aged 93.

Amateur wins
1932 Queensland Amateur

Professional wins (48)
1935 Queensland Open
1936 Queensland Open, New South Wales PGA
1937 Queensland Open
1938 Philippine Open, Lakes Open
1939 Philippine Open, New South Wales Close, Lakes Open
1940 Queensland Open
1946 Australian PGA Championship, New South Wales Close, New South Wales PGA, News Chronicle Tournament
1947 New South Wales Close, Dunlop-Southport Tournament, The Star Tournament, North British-Harrogate Tournament, Lotus Tournament, Penfold Tournament (tie with Dai Rees and Reg Whitcombe), Yorkshire Evening News Tournament (tie with Henry Cotton), Brand-Lochryn Tournament
1948 Daily Mail Tournament, Spalding Tournament, Manchester Evening Chronicle Tournament, Lotus Tournament, Dunlop Masters, Australian PGA Championship, New South Wales Close, New South Wales PGA
1949 Queensland Open, McWilliam's Wines Tournament, Adelaide Advertiser Tournament
1950 Australian Open, Australian PGA Championship
1951 Australian PGA Championship, New South Wales PGA, McWilliam's Wines Tournament, Yorkshire Evening News Tournament (tie with Dai Rees)
1952 Australian Open, McWilliam's Wines Tournament, Ampol Tournament (Oct)
1953 Australian Open, Queensland Open, New South Wales Close
1954 New South Wales Close
1961 Queensland Open
1965 North Coast Open

Results in major championships

Note: Von Nida never played in the PGA Championship.

NT = no tournament
CUT = missed the half-way cut
WD = withdrew
"T" indicates a tie for a place

Team appearances
Canada Cup (representing Australia): 1956
Lakes International Cup (representing Australia): 1952, 1954 (winners)
Slazenger Trophy (representing British Commonwealth and Empire): 1956
Vicars Shield (representing New South Wales): 1937 (winners), 1938 (winners), 1939, 1949 (winners), 1950 (winners), 1951, 1952, 1954 (winners), 1955 (winners)

References

External links

Life membership on PGA Tour of Australasia
Bio on Malaysian Golf Assoc. website
Farewell to the Von - obituary

Australian male golfers
PGA Tour of Australasia golfers
Recipients of the Medal of the Order of Australia
Sport Australia Hall of Fame inductees
People from the Inner West (Sydney)
Australian Army personnel of World War II
Australian Army soldiers
1914 births
2007 deaths